The 2012–13 Israel State Cup (Gvia HaMedina) was the 74th season of Israel's nationwide football cup competition and the 59th after the Israeli Declaration of Independence. It began on 31 August 2012, while the final was held in Netanya Stadium on 8 May 2013.

The competition was won by Hapoel Ramat Gan who had beaten Ironi Kiryat Shmona 4–2 on penalties after 1–1 in the final.

By winning, Hapoel Ramat Gan, qualified for the 2013–14 UEFA Europa League, entering in the Third qualifying round.

Calendar

Results

Seventh Round
The 16 winners from the previous round of the competition join 12 Liga Leumit clubs in this stage of the competition. The other 4 clubs from Liga Leumit received a bye for the next round. These matches were played on 1 and 2 January 2013.

Eighth Round
The 14 winners from the previous round of the competition join the 4 clubs from Liga Leumit, which received a bye for this round and the 16 clubs from the Israeli Premier League in this stage of the competition. These matches were played on 29 and 30 January 2013.

Round of 16
The 16 winners of the previous round entered this stage of the competition. These matches took place on 26 and 27 February 2013.

Quarter-finals
The eight winners of the previous round entered this stage of the competition. These matches took place on 12 and 13 March 2013.

Semi-finals
The four winners of the previous round entered this stage of the competition. These matches took place on 17 April 2013.

Final

External links
 Israel Football Association website 

Israel State Cup
State Cup
Israel State Cup seasons